Coulter may refer to:

People
 Coulter (surname)
 Coulter Osborne (born 1934), Canadian arbitrator and former Associate Chief Justice of Ontario

Places
 Coulter, South Lanarkshire, Scotland, a village and civil parish
 Coulter, Iowa, United States, a city
 Coulter, Pennsylvania, United States, an unincorporated community
 Coulter Brook, New York, United States
 Mount Coulter, Queen Elizabeth Land, Antarctica
 Coulter Glacier, Alexander Island, Antarctica
 Coulter Heights, Marie Byrd Land, Antarctica
 18776 Coulter, an asteroid

Other uses
 Coulter (agriculture), a part of a plow or seed drill
 Coulter Field, a public airfield in Texas
 Coulter Field (Bishop's), Quebec, Canada, a Bishop's University stadium
 Coulter Flats, also known as The Coulter, an apartment building in Indianapolis, Indiana, United States, on the National Register of Historic Places
 Coulter railway station, Coulter, South Lanarkshire, Scotland
 Coulter's, a defunct Los Angeles department store

See also
Coulter counter, an apparatus for counting and sizing particles suspended in electrolytes
Cutler (disambiguation)
Colter (disambiguation)